Justinian Ovchinnikov (born Victor Ivanovich Ovchinnikov, 28 January 1961 in Kosteryovo, Vladimir Oblast) is a high-ranking member of the  Russian Orthodox Church. He held the title of archbishop of the patriarchal parishes in the United States from March 2010 to 2014.

Prior to this appointment, he was head of the Diocese of Tiraspol, in Transnistria (Moldova) and its mother church, the Christmas Church from 1998 to 2010.

References

Bishops of the Russian Orthodox Church
Russian Orthodoxy in the United States
1961 births
Living people
People from Vladimir Oblast